The Crunchyroll Anime Awards, also known simply  as The Anime Awards, are awards given annually by the anime streaming service Crunchyroll to recognize the best anime of the previous year. Announced in December 2016, the awards were first presented in January 2017. Crunchyroll describes it as a "global event [that] recognizes the anime shows, characters, and artists that fans around the world love most."

The 7th ceremony was held physically on March 4, 2023, in Tokyo, Japan. Cyberpunk: Edgerunners won the Anime of the Year award.

Process 

The awards have two rounds of voting. In the first round, each judges will submit up to five candidates per category. The six candidates that got the highest number of cumulative nominations from the panel will the be included in the final list. During the voting period, which lasts for a week, the public can choose a single nominee per category per day. The winners for each category are the ones who received the most votes from the judges and the public. 70% of the votes will come from the judges, with 30% coming from the results of the public voting.

Any anime that was produced primarily in Japan and was released legally on television or online in Japan from November of two years prior to September of the past year are eligible to be nominated. This means that, for the 7th edition, any anime that was released from November 2021 to September 2022 are eligible.

The set of categories that will be presented changes for each edition. The 7th edition, for example, will feature 31 categories.

Categories

Current 

 Anime of the Year (since 2017)
 Best Main Character (since 2023)
 Best Supporting Character (since 2023)
 "Must Protect At All Costs" Character (since 2023)
 Best Opening Sequence (since 2017)
 Best Ending Sequence (since 2017)
 Best Anime Song (since 2023)
 Best VA Performance (JP) (since 2019)
 Best VA Performance (EN) (since 2019)
 Best VA Performance (DE) (since 2022)
 Best VA Performance (FR) (since 2022)
 Best VA Performance (LA) (since 2022)
 Best VA Performance (SP) (since 2022)
 Best VA Performance (PT) (since 2022)
 Best VA Performance (AR) (since 2023)
 Best VA Performance (IT) (since 2023)
 Best Director (since 2019)
 Best Animation (since 2017)
 Best Film (2018–2019; since 2022)
 Best Continuing Series (2018–2019; since 2023)
 Best New Series (since 2023)
 Best Original Anime (since 2023)
 Best Character Design (since 2019)
 Best Drama (since 2017)
 Best Comedy (since 2017)
 Best Score (since 2018)
 Best Fantasy (since 2020)
 Best Action (2017–2018; since 2022)
 Best Romance (since 2022)

Special 

 Industry Icon Award (2018–2020)
 Special Achievement Award (since 2023)
 Presenter's Choice (since 2023)

Former 

 Best Protagonist (2017–2022)
 Best Antagonist (2017–2022)
 Best Boy (2017–2022)
 Best Girl (2017–2022)
 Best Fight Scene (2017–2022)
 Most Heartwarming Scene (2017)
 Best CGI (2018)
 Best Slice of Life (2019)
 Best Manga (2018)
 Best Couple (2017–2018; 2020–2021)

Hero of the Year and Villain of the Year awards were renamed as "Best Hero" and "Best Villain" respectively in 2018. However, they were renamed again in 2019 as "Best Protagonist" and "Best Antagonist" respectively. On the same edition, "Best Opening" and "Best Ending" were renamed as "Best Opening Sequence" and "Best Ending Sequence" as well.

Editions

Notable awards and nominees

Series 

The following nominees received multiple nominations (5 or more):

The following winners received multiple awards (2 or more):

Films 

The following nominees received multiple nominations (2 or more):

The following winners received multiple awards (2 or more):

Records (as of March 2023)

Nominees 
Attack on Titan earned the highest nominations in each year with 34, including Anime of the Year twice.
Spy × Family earned the highest nominations in a single year / edition (7th) with 19.
Megalo Box and Wonder Egg Priority are the two anime series to receive the most nominations with 11, without a win.
Wonder Egg Priority is the only original anime series to receive the most nominations without a win and did not nominate the Anime of the Year category.
Demon Slayer: Kimetsu no Yaiba – The Movie: Mugen Train and Jujutsu Kaisen 0 earned the most nominations for films with 4.

Winners 
 My Hero Academia earned the highest wins in each year with 15.
At the 2nd edition, My Hero Academia nearly swept all of the categories except the Anime of the Year, as well as earned the highest wins in a single year with 8 including an Industry Icon Award for Christopher Sabat, who voiced All Might as well as Vegeta and Piccolo from the Dragon Ball franchise.
 At the inaugural ceremony, Yuri on Ice swept all of the seven nominations including the Anime of the Year, amid controversy by fans.
 Demon Slayer: Kimetsu no Yaiba – The Movie: Mugen Train and Jujutsu Kaisen 0 earned the most wins for a film with 3.
 Cyberpunk: Edgerunners is the first anime adaptation of video games to win the Anime of the Year category, which was based on a video game Cyberpunk 2077 by Polish video game development studio CD Projekt Red.
 Demon Slayer: Kimetsu no Yaiba earned the most wins for a franchise with 17.

See also 
 List of animation awards

References

External links
 
 

Crunchyroll
Anime awards
Awards established in 2017